Sheikh Khalad Abdalla (Arabic:خالد عبد الله يونس)(b. 1964) is an Egyptian television news host on the Islamic satellite channel al-Nas (Arabic قناة الناس ).  On his September 8, 2012, show he played a clip from Innocence of Muslims, a few days prior to the 2012 diplomatic missions attacks
 Al Jazeera English called him controversial and hardline.

References

Living people
1964 births
Egyptian television presenters
Egyptian journalists